The Covington Astros were a minor league baseball team that played from 1967 to 1976 in the Appalachian League. Affiliated with the Houston Astros, they were located in Covington, Virginia. They played their home games at Casey Field. In 1966, the team played as the Covington Red Sox and were a farm team of the Boston Red Sox.

Year-by-year record

Notable alumni

 Bob Bourne (1972) NHL player 1974-1988

 Bruce Bochy (1975) 1996 NL Manager of the Year; Manager: 2010, 2012, 2014 World Series Champions - San Francisco Giants

 Cesar Cedeno (1968) 4 x MLB All-Star

 Mike Easler (1969) MLB All-Star

 Clark Gillies (1970-1972) Hockey Hall of Fame 2002 inductee

 Greg Gross (1970)

 Cliff Johnson (1967)

 John Milner (1968)

 John Mayberry (1967) 2 x MLB All-Star

 Terry Puhl (1974) MLB All-Star

 J.R.  Richard (1969) MLB All-Star; 1979 NL ERA Leader

 Joe Sambito (1973) MLB All-Star

Baseball teams established in 1967
Defunct Appalachian League teams
Defunct baseball teams in Virginia
Houston Astros minor league affiliates
1967 establishments in Virginia
1976 disestablishments in Virginia
Baseball teams disestablished in 1976